George Kenneth "Trey" Griffey III (born January 19, 1994) is a former American football wide receiver. He played college football for the University of Arizona. He is the son of Major League Baseball Hall of Famer Ken Griffey Jr.

Amateur career
Griffey attended Dr. Phillips High School in Orlando, Florida. As a senior, he had 73 receptions for 970 yards and 11 touchdowns. He committed to the University of Arizona to play college football.

After redshirting his first year at Arizona in 2012, Griffey played in 11 games with four starts in 2013. He had 14 receptions for 170 yards and two touchdowns. As a sophomore in 2014, he played in all 14 games with two starts and recorded 31 receptions for 405 yards and a touchdown. As a junior, he played in six games due to an injury. He finished with 11 receptions for 284 yards and one touchdown.

Professional career

Indianapolis Colts
Griffey was not selected in the 2017 NFL Draft, and signed with the Indianapolis Colts as an undrafted free agent on May 4, 2017. On June 12, 2017, he was waived/injured by the Colts and placed on injured reserve. He was waived from injured reserve on July 7, 2017.

Miami Dolphins
On August 15, 2017, Griffey was signed by the Miami Dolphins. He was waived on September 2, 2017.

Pittsburgh Steelers
On January 29, 2018, Griffey signed a reserve/future contract with the Pittsburgh Steelers. He was waived on September 1, 2018 and was signed to the practice squad the next day. He signed a reserve/future contract with the Steelers on January 1, 2019. He was waived on August 31, 2019.

Personal life
Griffey is the son of Major League Baseball (MLB) player Ken Griffey Jr., and the grandson of MLB player Ken Griffey Sr. Trey Griffey was drafted by the Seattle Mariners in the 24th round of the 2016 MLB Draft; both his father and grandfather played for the Mariners. That round was chosen because Griffey Jr.'s uniform number with the Mariners was 24.

References

External links
Arizona Wildcats bio

1994 births
Living people
African-American players of American football
American football wide receivers
Arizona Wildcats football players
Dr. Phillips High School alumni
Indianapolis Colts players
Miami Dolphins players
Pittsburgh Steelers players
Players of American football from Orlando, Florida
Players of American football from Seattle